Prince Jean Marie François Ferdinand de Broglie (21 June 1921 – 24 December 1976) was a French politician.

Born in Paris, he was one of the negotiators of the Évian Accords.

Jean de Broglie was assassinated on 24 December 1976 while coming out of the house of Pierre de Varga. His financial advisor, Varga was quickly arrested; in 1981, he was sentenced to ten years imprisonment for complicity in the assassination.

Jean de Broglie was the first son of Prince Eugene Marie Amédée de Broglie (1891–1957), himself the fourth son of Prince François Marie Albert de Broglie (1851–1939), himself the fourth son of Albert de Broglie, 4th duc de Broglie, whose mother, Albertine de Staël-Holstein (1797–1838), was the daughter of Germaine de Staël and, reputedly, Benjamin Constant.

By his wife Micheline Segard (1925–1997), he had three sons:
 Victor-François de Broglie (Paris, 25 March 1949 - Broglie, 12 February 2012), 8th duke of Broglie, who succeeded a distinguished distant cousin, Louis de Broglie, 7th duke of Broglie (1892–1987), physicist and Nobel laureate
 Philippe-Maurice de Broglie (Paris, 28 September 1960), 9th duke of Broglie
 Louis-Albert de Broglie (Paris, 15 March 1963), prince of Broglie

References

Sources

Offices held
 Secrétaire d'État chargé de la Fonction publique (April to November 1962)
 Secrétaire d'État aux Affaires algériennes (1962–1966)
 Secrétaire d'État aux Affaires étrangères  (1966–1967)
deputee de L'Eure
President de Assembly National 1959

1921 births
1976 deaths
Politicians from Paris
Jean
Princes of Broglie
Rally of the French People politicians
National Centre of Independents and Peasants politicians
Independent Republicans politicians
Deputies of the 1st National Assembly of the French Fifth Republic
Deputies of the 2nd National Assembly of the French Fifth Republic
Deputies of the 3rd National Assembly of the French Fifth Republic
Deputies of the 4th National Assembly of the French Fifth Republic
Deputies of the 5th National Assembly of the French Fifth Republic
Assassinated French politicians
1976 murders in France
Deaths by firearm in France
People murdered in France